Surayya is a Pakistani melodrama film directed by Shabab Kiranvi, who also wrote the screenplay and dialogues. The films stars Nayyar Sultana in the titular role along with Habib-ur-Rehman, who played the male lead, and both played the young to old roles in the film. The film was released in January 1961 and was a box office hit. At annual Nigar Awards, Rehman won Best Actor award for his performance in the film.

Plot 

Surayya and Yousuf love each other since childhood however, get separate when Surayya's brother Toufik decides to marry her with Dilshad. Yousuf sends her mother to Surayya's house with his proposal but Toufik denies her insultingly due to past conflict between the two families.

Surayya goes to Lahore after marrying Dilshad. On the other hand, Yousuf's mother gets him married to Yaseem. He gets a job of manager in Dilshad's office in Lahore. After an year, Yasmeen dies after giving birth to a child. On the other hand, Surayya gives birth to still child. Due to Surayya and Dilshad's sorrow, Buland Iqbal (son-in-law of Dilshad's aunt) advises Dilshad to adapt Yousuf's son which will be beneficial for both of them, as his own wife has died and it will be difficult to brought him up with mother. In this way, Dilshad brings Yousuf's child to his house but on repenting of his decision of separating of a father from his son, he allows Yousuf to visit his house to meet his child. There, he encounters Surayya.

Cast 

 Nayyar Sultana ... Surayya
 Habib-ur-Rehman ... Yousuf
 Azad ... Toufik
 Asad Bokhari ... Dilshad
 Salma Mumtaz ... Toufik's wife
 Bibbo ... Yousuf's mother
 Zeenat ... Dilshad's aunt
 Ali Baba ... Buland Iqbal
 Shehzad ... Mushtaq
 Yasmin ... Yasmeen
 Nasira ... Razia
 Rukhsana ... Najmi, Toufik's daughter
 Aslam Pervaiz .... Saleem

Release 

The film released on 13 January 1961.

Music

Awards 
 Nigar Award for Best Actor - Habib-ur-Rehman

References

External links 
 

1960s Urdu-language films
Urdu-language Pakistani films